Katja Ebstein (born Karin Witkiewicz; 9 March 1945) is a German singer. She was born in Girlachsdorf (now Gniewków, Poland). She achieved success with songs such as "Theater" and "Es war einmal ein Jäger".

Ebstein represented Germany at the Eurovision Song Contest three times, in 1970, 1971 and 1980. She also took part in Ein Lied für Stockholm in 1975 with the song "Ich liebe dich", placing 5th in the selection. . Her best performance was in 1980 when she gained second place with the entry "Theater", her other two songs  "Wunder gibt es immer wieder" and "Diese Welt" each came to third places. As noted by John Kennedy O'Connor in his book The Eurovision Song Contest – The Official History, Ebstein is the most successful performer to have taken part in the contest without ever winning. She is the only singer to appear in the top three on three occasions.

Discography

Studio albums 
Katja (Liberty 1969)
Wunder gibt es immer wieder (Liberty 1970)
Mein Leben ist wie ein Lied (Liberty 1970)
Freunde (United Artists 1971)
Katja Ebstein en español (United Artists 1971) (not released in Germany)
Wir leben – wir lieben (United Artists 1972)
Katja (United Artists 1973)
The star of Mykonos (United Artists 1974) (not released in Germany)
Le soleil de Mykonos (United Artists 1974) (not released in Germany)
…was ich noch singen wollte (United Artists 1974)
Wilde Rosen und andere Träume (EMI Electrola 1974)
Katja Ebstein singt Heinrich Heine (EMI Electrola 1975)
Katja & Co. (Personality-Show) (EMI Electrola 1976)
In Petersburg ist Pferdemarkt (EMI Electrola 1976)
Liebe (EMI Electrola 1977)
So wat wie ick et bin… kann nur aus Berlin sein (EMI Electrola 1978)
Glashaus (Ariola 1980)
Katja live (Ariola 1980)
He du da… (Ariola 1980)
Kopf hoch (Ariola 1981)
Mein Name ist Katja (Personality Shor) (Ariola 1982)
Traumzeit??? (Ariola 1982)
Lyrikerinnen (with Lutz Görner) (Rezitheater-Verlag 1990)
LiLaLutsche – ich rutsche auf der Rutsche (Children's Songs) (Igel Records 1991)
Ebstein (Polydor 1994)
Meisterinnenwerke (CAT Music 1996)
Ave von Medjugorje – Pilgerlieder (mit Inge Brück) (CAT Music 1996)
Ave from Medjugorje – Pilgrim songs (mit Inge Brück) (CAT Music 1997)
Ave de Medjugorje – Chansons pelèrines (mit Inge Brück) (CAT Music 1997)
Ave von Medjugorje (in Bosnian language) (mit Inge Brück) (CAT Music 1997)
Lasst Euch nicht verführen! – Katja Ebstein singt und spricht Bertolt Brecht (Deutsche Grammophon 1999)
Berlin… trotz und alledem! (Deutsche Grammophon 1999)
Es fällt ein Stern herunter… (CAT Music 2001)
Witkiewicz (EMI 2005)

Singles 
 Wovon träumt ein Weihnachtsbaum im Mai [What does a Christmas tree dream about in May] (1969) – German version of the song "Do You Know How Christmas Trees Are Grown?", which is from the soundtrack of On Her Majesty's Secret Service
 Wunder gibt es immer wieder (1970) – 3rd in Eurovision Song Contest 1970 – # 16
 Und wenn ein neuer Tag erwacht (1970)
 Diese Welt (1971) – 3rd in Eurovision Song Contest 1971 – # 16
 Ein kleines Lied vom Frieden (1971)
 Inch Allah (1972)
 Der Stern von Mykonos (1973) – # 4, (AUS #6)
 Ein Indiojunge aus Peru (1974)
 Athena (1974)
 Es war einmal ein Jäger (1975) – # 4
 Die Hälfte seines Lebens (1975)
 Aus Liebe weint man nicht (1976)
 In Petersburg ist Pferdemarkt (1977)
 Du und ich (1977)
 Wein nicht um mich, Argentinien (1977)
 Weck mich, bevor du gehst (1977)
 Dieser Mann ist ein Mann (1978)
 Es müssen keine Rosen sein (1979)
 Trink mit mir (1979)
 Abschied ist ein bißchen wie sterben (1980) – # 10
 Theater (1980) – 2nd in Eurovision Song Contest 1980 – # 11
 Dann heirat' doch dein Büro (1980)
 Traumzeit (1982)

References

External links 

Official website

1945 births
Living people
People from Świdnica County
People from the Province of Lower Silesia
German women singers
Eurovision Song Contest entrants for Germany
Eurovision Song Contest entrants of 1970
Eurovision Song Contest entrants of 1971
Eurovision Song Contest entrants of 1980
Recipients of the Cross of the Order of Merit of the Federal Republic of Germany